Tomasz Kot (born 21 April 1977) is a Polish film, television, and theatre actor. He has appeared in more than 30 films and 26 plays as well as dozens of television series. He received the Polish Academy Award for Best Actor for his role in 2014 film Gods.

Education and career
He graduated from the Tadeusz Kościuszko High School No. 1 in Legnica. On 17 November 1996, he made his theatre debut on the stage of the Dramatic Theatre in Legnica in Stanisław Ignacy Witkiewicz's play Madame Tutli-Putli directed by Wiesław Cichy. In 2001, he graduated from the AST National Academy of Theatre Arts in Kraków. He gained great popularity by portraying singer Ryszard Riedel in Jan Kidawa Błoński's 2005 film Destined for Blues as well as for his role as Zbigniew Religa in Łukasz Palkowski's 2014 film Gods. In 2015, he was awarded the Medal for Merit to Culture – Gloria Artis.

In 2018, Kot received award-season buzz for his starring role as Wiktor in Paweł Pawlikowski’s feature Cold War for Amazon. The project has earned him a nomination for best actor by the European Film Awards and the movie has been recognized by the Critics' Choice Movie Awards, New York Film Critics Circle, and the National Board of Review in the best foreign language film category. In 2018 Kot appeared in Agnieszka Holland’s Spoor and had a starring role in Jaroslaw Marszewski’s “Bikini Blue,” the latter earning him the award for best lead actor at the Milan Film Festival. In 2019 Kot starred in BBC One series World on Fire alongside Brian J. Smith, Julia Brown, and Helen Hunt.

Personal life
On 30 September 2006 in Częstochowa, he married actress Agnieszka Olczyk. They have two children: Blanka (b. 2007) and Leon (b. 2010).

Selected filmography

See also 
 Cinema of Poland
 List of Poles

References

External links 

1977 births
Living people
People from Legnica
Polish male film actors
Polish male stage actors
Polish male television actors
Polish male voice actors